Xiaohan is one of the solar terms of several East Asian calendars.

Xiaohan may also refer to:
Xiaohan (lyricist), Singaporean lyricist
Xiaohan (region), a region in China

See also
 Xiao Han (disambiguation)